PFL Challenger Series is an American mixed martial arts promotion. Young and up-and-coming male and female MMA prospects will compete for a slot in the PFL tournament season and a chance at $1 million. Each week, the PFL Challenger Series will consist of a celebrity guest panel featuring personalities in film, athletics, and music. Mike Tyson, along with NFL stars Ray Lewis and Todd Gurley, are just a few of the names who will decide who gets a shot in the league.

Season One 
The PFL Challenger Series will debut on fuboTV. The eight events will stream on consecutive Friday nights starting Feb. 18, and run through March. It will also air on its linear network, Fubo Sports Network.

Week 1 - February 18

Contract awards 
The following fighters were awarded contracts with the PFL:
 Bruce Souto

Week 2 - February 25

Contract awards 
The following fighters were awarded contracts with the PFL:
Jarrah Al Silawi
Chris Mixan was signed to a development league contract

Week 3 - March 4

Contract awards 
The following fighters were awarded contracts with the PFL:

 Martina Jindrová

Week 4 - March 11

Contract awards 
The following fighters were awarded contracts with the PFL:

 Boston Salmon

Week 5 - March 18

Contract awards 
The following fighters were awarded contracts with the PFL:

 Bruno Miranda

Week 6 - March 25

Contract awards 
The following fighters were awarded contracts with the PFL:

 Adam Keresh

Week 7 - April 1 

The event will feature every fighter making their mixed martial arts debut.

Contract awards 
The following fighters were awarded contracts with the PFL:

 Alexei Pergande was signed to a development league contract

Week 8 - April 8

Contract awards 
The following fighters were awarded contracts with the PFL:

 Simeon Powell

Season 2

Week 1 - January 27

Contract awards 
The following fighters were awarded contracts with the PFL:

 Thad Jean

Week 2 - February 3

Contract awards 
The following fighters were awarded contracts with the PFL:

Amanda Leve

Week 3 - February 10

Contract awards 
The following fighters were awarded contracts with the PFL:

Abraham Bably

Week 4 - February 17

Contract awards 
The following fighters were awarded contracts with the PFL:

Elvin Espinoza

Week 5 - February 24

Contract awards 
The following fighters were awarded contracts with the PFL:

Desiree Yanez

Week 6 - March 3

Contract awards 
The following fighters were awarded contracts with the PFL:

	Brahyan Zurcher

Week 7 - March 10

Contract awards 
The following fighters were awarded contracts with the PFL:
 Impa Kasanganay

Week 8 - March 17

Contract awards 
The following fighters were awarded contracts with the PFL:
Denzel Freeman

See also 

 List of PFL events
 List of current PFL fighters

References

External links
 
 PFL event results at Tapology
 WSOF event results at Sherdog

Challenger Series